Discodoris sauvagei is a species of sea slug or dorid nudibranch, a marine gastropod mollusk in the family Discodorididae.

Distribution 
This species occurs off the Cape Verde islands.

References

Discodorididae
Gastropods described in 1881
Gastropods of Cape Verde